The individual, wild species of lizards, snakes, and turtles extant in the U.S. state of Colorado:

Lizards

§Article exists for this species, but not the subspecies.

*Article exists for this genus, but not the individual species.

Snakes

§Article exists for this species, but not the subspecies.

*Article exists for this genus, but not the individual species.

Turtles

†Red-eared sliders are an introduced and invasive species to Colorado.

References

External links

Reptiles
Colorado